Bulbophyllum ardjunense is a species of orchid in the genus Bulbophyllum.

References

External links
The Bulbophyllum-Checklist
The Internet Orchid Species Photo Encyclopedia

ardjunense